Johnstown is the name of some places in the U.S. state of Wisconsin:
Johnstown, Pepin County, Wisconsin, an unincorporated community
Johnstown, Polk County, Wisconsin, a town
Johnstown, Rock County, Wisconsin, a town
Johnstown (community), Wisconsin, an unincorporated community
Johnstown Center, Wisconsin, an unincorporated community